Big Trout Lake is a large lake in Northern Ontario. The Fawn River flows into it from the west and drains it from the east. The reserve of the Kitchenuhmaykoosib Inninuwug First Nation, also known as Big Trout Lake, is located on Post Island on the lake's northern shore.

See also
List of lakes in Ontario

References

Lakes of Kenora District